Tennis, for the 2019 Island Games, held at the Bayside Sports Complex and Gibraltar Sandpits Lawn Tennis Club, Gibraltar in July 2019.

Medal table

Results

References 

2019 Island Games
2019
Island Games